Jackson Marriott Downtown is a hotel in downtown Jackson, Mississippi by Marriott International. It was completed in 1975. It has a total of 21 floors. Currently it is the second tallest building in Jackson, Mississippi at 255 ft (78 m) tall. It has a total of 303 rooms.

Hotel buildings completed in 1975
Skyscrapers in Jackson, Mississippi
Skyscraper hotels in Mississippi